Clemencia may refer to:

Clemencia (name), list of people with the name
Clemencia, Colombia, a town and municipality located in the Bolívar Department, northern Colombia
Espada de clemencia, species of freshwater fish in the family Poeciliidae